Sphodromantis quinquecallosa is a species of praying mantis found in Africa.

See also
African mantis
List of mantis genera and species

References

quinquecallosa
Mantodea of Africa
Insects described in 1916